Andretti Bain (born 1 December 1985) is a Bahamian sprinter who specializes in the 400 metres. He was born in Nassau.

Bain finished fifth in 4 x 400 metres relay at the 2004 World Indoor Championships, together with teammates Chris Brown, Timothy Munnings and Dennis Darling.

He was the NCAA Indoor Champion at 400m in 2008 for Oral Roberts University, in Tulsa, Oklahoma. He set an indoor personal best of 46.02 in the preliminary round.

Bain also won the 2008 NCAA Outdoor 400m Championship in 44.62 over USC's Lionel Larry, for Oral Roberts University.

Was part of the Bahamas' silver-medal winning team in the men's 4 × 400 m relay at the 2008 Beijing Olympics. Bain graduated from Oral Roberts University.

References

External links

1985 births
Living people
Sportspeople from Nassau, Bahamas
Bahamian male sprinters
Olympic athletes of the Bahamas
Athletes (track and field) at the 2008 Summer Olympics
Olympic silver medalists for the Bahamas
Oral Roberts University alumni
Oral Roberts Golden Eagles athletes
Commonwealth Games medallists in athletics
Medalists at the 2008 Summer Olympics
Athletes (track and field) at the 2007 Pan American Games
Pan American Games gold medalists for the Bahamas
Athletes (track and field) at the 2010 Commonwealth Games
Athletes (track and field) at the 2014 Commonwealth Games
Olympic silver medalists in athletics (track and field)
Commonwealth Games silver medallists for the Bahamas
Pan American Games medalists in athletics (track and field)
Athletes (track and field) at the 2015 Pan American Games
Central American and Caribbean Games silver medalists for the Bahamas
Competitors at the 2010 Central American and Caribbean Games
Central American and Caribbean Games medalists in athletics
Medalists at the 2007 Pan American Games
Medallists at the 2014 Commonwealth Games